The Pont de l'Archevêché (Archbishop's Bridge) is a bridge crossing the Seine river in Paris, France.

Location

The bridge links the 4th Arrondissement, at the Île de la Cité, to the 5th Arrondissement, between the quai de Montebello and the quai de la Tournelle.

Access

History 
The Pont de l'Archevêché is the narrowest road bridge in Paris. It was built in 1828, by the engineer Plouard, for the society Pont des Invalides after the demolition of the suspension bridge at Les Invalides. 

The bridge commonly seen in the background of the set on Highlander when the show was set in Paris.
After the Pont des Arts was cleared of its display of padlocks in 2010, and similarly the Passerelle Léopold-Sédar-Senghor, lovers started to place their 'love padlocks' on this bridge. The original two bridges for this were footbridges, but this one, a bit narrower, is a road bridge.

Characteristics 
 Type of construction : Arch bridge
 Construction : 1828
 Architect : 	Plouard
 Material : stone
 Total Length : 
 Width : 
 Usable width :

References

External links 

  Mayor of Paris' website
  Structurae
 Satellite View from Google Map
  http://www.lefigaro.fr/actualite-france/2008/09/14/01016-20080914ARTFIG00013-une-vedette-de-plaisance-sombre-sur-la-seine-.php

Buildings and structures in the 4th arrondissement of Paris
Buildings and structures in the 5th arrondissement of Paris
Archeveche
Archeveche